Andre Torrey (born January 28, 1982) is an American football linebacker who is currently a free agent.  He formerly played for the San Francisco 49ers in the NFL.

1982 births
Living people
Players of American football from Oakland, California
American football linebackers
Arizona Wildcats football players
San Francisco 49ers players